George Young may refer to:

Arts and entertainment 
 George Young (filmmaker), Australian stage manager and film director in the silent era
 George Young (rock musician) (1946–2017), Australian musician, songwriter, and record producer
 George Young (actor) (born 1980), British actor
 George Young (saxophonist) (born 1937), American musician, member of Manhattan Jazz Quintet
 Sir George Young, 4th Baronet (1872–1952), English author and Cambridge Union Society president

Law and politics 
 George Young (diplomat), (died c. 1615), Scottish diplomat and administrator
 George Renny Young (1802–1853), Scottish-born journalist, lawyer, author and political figure in Nova Scotia
 George Young, Lord Young (1819–1907), Scottish politician and judge
 George Frederick Young (1791–1870), English shipbuilder and politician
 George Kennedy Young (1911–1990), British intelligence officer and right-wing politician
 George Young, Baron Young of Cookham (born 1941), British Conservative Party politician
 George B. Young (1840–1906), American lawyer and judge
 George C. Young (1916–2015), American lawyer and judge
 George E. Young, American clergyman and member of the Oklahoma House of Representatives
 George U. Young (1867–1926), American businessman and politician in Arizona
 George M. Young (1870–1932), U.S. congressman from North Dakota
 George Young (Australian politician) (1823–1869), businessman and politician in the colony of South Australia
 George Young (Victorian politician) (1848–1891), politician in the colony of Victoria, Australia
 George A. Young (mayor), former mayor of Cumberland, Maryland

Medicine
 George Young (surgeon) (1692–1757), Edinburgh surgeon, physician, philosopher and empiric
 George Young (surgeon and botanist) (died 1803), British military surgeon and botanist

Religion
 George Young (Presbyterian minister) (1777–1848), Scottish Presbyterian minister
 George Young (Methodist minister) (1821–1910), Canadian Methodist minister
 George Young (priest) (1852–1937), Dean of Adelaide, 1906–1933
 George D. Young III (born 1955), American bishop

Sports 
 George Young (cricketer) (1847–1935), New Zealand cricketer
 George Young (baseball) (1890–1950), American professional baseball player
 George Young (swimmer) (1909–1972), Canadian marathon swimmer
 George Young (Scottish footballer) (1922–1997), footballer with Rangers and Scotland
 George Young (Welsh footballer) (born 1950), footballer with Newport County 
 George Young (American football executive) (1930–2001)
 George Young (athlete) (1937–2022), American track and field athlete, Olympic medalist
 George Young (British athlete) (1885–1952), British Olympic athlete
 George Young (Australian rules footballer) (born 1949), Australian rules player and cricketer in the 1970s
 George Young (American football) (1924–1969)
 George Young (rugby union) (born 2001), Welsh rugby union player
 George Avery Young (1866–1900), British cricketer and Wales international rugby player
 George Ashworth Young (1878–1920), Australian rules footballer

Others 
 George Young (Royal Navy officer) (1732–1810), British Royal Navy admiral
 G. M. Young (George Malcolm Young, 1882–1959), English historian
 George Young (architect) (1858–1933), Scottish architect
 George Young (Neighbours), fictional character in the Australian soap opera Neighbours

See also
George Jung (born 1942), American cocaine smuggler